Leopold Weiss can refer to:

 Muhammad Asad, 20th-century writer and diplomat whose name was Leopold Weiss before he converted to Islam
 Sylvius Leopold Weiss, 17th-century German lutenist and composer
 Lipót Fejér, 19-20th century mathematician whose birth name was Leopold Weisz